Capenhurst is a civil parish in Cheshire West and Chester, England.  It contains three buildings that are recorded in the National Heritage List for England as designated listed buildings, all of which are at Grade II.  This grade is the lowest of the three gradings given to listed buildings and is applied to "buildings of national importance and special interest".  The listed buildings consist of a church, a pinfold, and a guidepost.

See also
Listed buildings in Backford
Listed buildings in Ellesmere Port
Listed buildings in Ledsham
Listed buildings in Mollington
Listed buildings in Puddington

References
Citations

Sources

Listed buildings in Cheshire West and Chester
Lists of listed buildings in Cheshire